Emem Isong  is a Nigerian screenwriter, film producer, and film director. She has become known primarily for films in the English language, and is a dominant figure in the Nollywood industry. Her second directed feature, Code of Silence, which deals with rape in Nigeria, was released in 2015.

Early life and education
Emem, who is the first child in her family of 4 children, was born on 5 September and is from Ikono Local Government Area of Akwa Ibom State in Nigeria. She obtained a Bachelor of Arts degree in Theater Arts from the University of Calabar. Isong obtained a diploma in computer science from the Computer Science Institute (NCR).

Career
Emem Isong’s career in filmmaking began in 1994 when she wrote the script and co-produced the movie Jezebel.  Her very first solo production was for the movie Breaking Point (1996). She then went on to work with Remmy Jez for eight years as a producer of his movies. This relationship lasted till 2008 when she decided to end their working relationship. It was at this time that she co-produced the movie Reloaded (2008).

She has written or produced films such as Reloaded, Breaking Point, She Devil, A Minute To Midnight, Play Boy, Private Sin, Master Stroke, Rumours, Shattered Illusion, Promise Me Forever and Emotional Crack (2003) (screenplay), the latter of which was screened at the African Film Festival in New York City. She has also become known primarily for Yoruba language pictures and is a dominant figure in that industry.

The movies Emem Isong has been involved in are also noteworthy for being the launching grounds for various Nollywood talents including Stephanie Okereke, Dakore Egbuson among others.

In 2014 Isong directed her first feature film Champagne, which had its premiere at the Silverbird Galleria in Victoria Island, Lagos.
In August 2015 she released the film Code of Silence, her second directed feature film which she also produced, working with the Royal Arts Academy and Nollywood Workshop, an international NGO that aims to encourage change in the society through the use of movies.
The film, which deals with rape in Nigeria, stars Makida Moka, Patience Ozokwor, Ini Edo, and Omoni Oboli.

Emem Isong’s expertise in the movie industry has also allowed her to be chosen as a speaker in the Afrinolly masterclass series and also as a judge for the MTN Afrinolly short film completion in 2013. In her movies Emem Isong attempts above all to thrill the audience.

Legacy
Emem has also been listed as a maverick in the New Nollywood movement which is categorized by filmmakers who are not just interested in producing movies, but in producing movies that can be considered substantial and artful products. These movies are usually categorized by an extra effort made by the filmmakers to ensure not only the methods, but also the tools of production employed by the film makers are of substantial quality. It is no longer about production for the sake of production, but rather production for art’s sake. These movies are also made to have not only domestic, but also international appeal as they are usually released in cinemas in Nigeria and in also in foreign cinemas. This shift from home video production to cinema viewing is also a category of this New Nollywood movement.

Emem Isong is also known for her role in founding the Royal Arts Academy in 2010 and her subsequent role as the academy’s CEO. The Royal Arts Academy which she started with Uduak Oguamanam, Anietie Isong, and actress Monalisa Chinda, is based in Surulere, Lagos State, Nigeria. The academy has tasked itself with a mandate concerned with the empowerment of its students by giving them the necessary tools required to take part in all aspects of film creation and production. The academy is dedicated to producing students who can not just compete and excel in the Nigerian film industry, but also in the international film industry. Apart from teaching students what they need to begin a career in the movie industry, the academy also gives students the opportunity to win funding to help them begin their career by actually producing movies the general public can see.

Personal life
Emem Isong is known to be very private and prefers to stay mostly out of the public eye, she rarely grants interviews. This, according to her, is because she wishes her work to be consumed on its merits alone without her personal life influencing her viewers. However, Isong is married to Misodi Akama with whom she had twins with in 2016. She also has a son from a previous relationship.

Filmography 
Emem Isong's film credits include:

Producer credits

Writer credits

Director credits

Awards and nominations 
Awards received by Emem Isong include:
 ZAFAA Awards, in the category of Best Producer for the movie Memories of my Heart (2010) 
 Wow Divas, Outstanding Contribution to Raising Awareness, Understanding and Hope to those Affected by Autism Spectrum Disorder and Advocating for them through her movie Silver Lining(2012)
 Eloy Awards, Best Movie Producer of the Year for I’ll Take My Chances (2011) 
 Best of Nollywood, Special Recognition Award; 
 Ntanla Awards, Industry Merit Awards. 
 Nigeria’s Integrity Film Awards(HomeVida) in the category Family/Child Friendly Category for the movie Knocking on the Heavens Door (2014) 
 Africa Movie Awards in the category of Best Scriptwriter for the movie Reloaded (2008)
 City Peoples Award in the categories of Best Producer of the Year, and Best Screenplay for the movie Reloaded (2008)

See also
 List of Nigerian film producers

References

Nigerian screenwriters
Nigerian film producers
Nigerian women film producers
Living people
University of Calabar alumni
Nigerian women film directors
Year of birth missing (living people)
Nigerian film directors
Actresses from Akwa Ibom State
People from Akwa Ibom State
21st-century Nigerian businesspeople
21st-century Nigerian businesswomen
20th-century Nigerian businesspeople